"Cocoon" is the fifth single by Welsh indie rock band Catfish and the Bottlemen. The song was included on their debut studio album, The Balcony. The single was released on 15 September 2014. The single did not contain a B-side.

Cocoon was written about Van’s on and off girlfriend Nyree Waters.

An acoustic version of the song was featured in the FIFA 15 video game soundtrack. This replaces 'but fuck it' with 'forget it', which also applies to the radio edit.

Track listing

Charts

Certifications

References

External links 
Cocoon - Single at Discogs
Lyrics of this song - Cocoon

2014 singles
2014 songs
Catfish and the Bottlemen songs
Island Records singles
Song recordings produced by Jim Abbiss